Oliver Manners (c. 1581 – July or August 1613) was an English politician.
He was the son of John Manners, 4th Earl of Rutland and his wife, Elizabeth Charlton.

He was a Member (MP) of the Parliament of England for Grantham in 1601.

References

1580s births
1613 deaths
English MPs 1601